In enzymology, a 2-nitropropane dioxygenase is an enzyme that catalyzes the chemical reaction

2 2-nitropropane + O2  2 acetone + 2 nitrite

Thus, the two substrates of this enzyme are 2-nitropropane and O2, whereas its two products are acetone and nitrite.

This enzyme belongs to the family of oxidoreductases, specifically those acting on single donors with O2 as oxidant and incorporation of two atoms of oxygen into the substrate (oxygenases). The oxygen incorporated need not be derived from O2.  The systematic name of this enzyme class is 2-nitropropane:oxygen 2-oxidoreductase. This enzyme participates in nitrogen metabolism.  It has 3 cofactors: FAD, Iron,  and FMN.

Structural studies

References

 
 
 

EC 1.13.11
Flavoproteins
Iron enzymes
Enzymes of known structure